Henry Joseph Colquit Patterson (July 17, 1907 – September 30, 1970) was a catcher in Major League Baseball. He was born in San Francisco.

Little is known about this utility player who put on a Boston Red Sox uniform late in the  season.

On September 5, 1932, Patterson appeared in a game against the Washington Senators at Griffith Stadium. He went hitless in his only at-bat and never appeared in a major league game again.

Patterson died at the age of 63 in Panorama City, California.

See also
1932 Boston Red Sox season
Boston Red Sox all-time roster
Cup of coffee

External links
Baseball Library - 1932 BRS
Baseball Reference
Retrosheet

Boston Red Sox players
Major League Baseball catchers
Baseball players from California
1907 births
1970 deaths